Senator du Pont may refer to:

Charles I. du Pont (1797–1869), Delaware State Senator
Henry A. du Pont (1838–1926), U.S. Senator from Delaware from 1906 to 1917
T. Coleman du Pont (1863–1930), U.S. Senator from Delaware from 1925 to 1928
Victor Marie du Pont (1767–1827), Delaware State Senator